Tamil Nadu Liberation Army (TNLA) was a small militant separatist group in India. It sought an independent nation for the Tamil people, and first appeared in the 1980s, when the Indian Peacekeeping Force (IPKF) was sent to Sri Lanka.

It had its roots in the Naxalite movement, and was headed by Thamizharasan, an engineering student from Ponparappi village. TNLA was involved in minor bomb blasts, murders and looting banks.

On 1 September 1987, the people of Ponparappi village lynched Thamizharasan and four of his associates, when they attempted to rob a bank. After his death, the group fell into disarray and splintered into factions. TNLA was banned by the Tamil Nadu State Government, and also by the Union Government on the recommendation of the State Government. It has been declared a terrorist organisation by the Government of India.

The group also carried out several bomb attacks on government buildings, railways, and buses, causing significant damage and loss of life.

See also
List of terrorist organisations in India
Tamil Eelam Liberation Army

References

History of Tamil Nadu
Separatism in India
Organisations designated as terrorist by India
Organizations based in Asia designated as terrorist
National liberation movements
Rebel groups in India
1980s establishments in Tamil Nadu
Organizations established in the 1980s